Far round the world thy children sing their song is an English hymn written by Basil Joseph Mathews (1879 – 1951) published in Church Hymnary in 1927.

Music
Far round the world appears in hymnals with various tunes:
 Dunblane Cathedral composed by Archie Fairbairn Barnes (1878 – 1960), published in 1927
 Farley Castle composed by Henry Lawes (1596 – 1662) in 1638
 Parting composed by Jane W. Rhodes in 1910
 Peel Castle arranged by William Henry Gill (1839 – 1923)
 Rutgers composed by Charles Henry Doersam (1879 – 1942)
 Woodlands composed by Walter Greatorex (1877 – 1949) for Gresham's School (where he was Director of Music) in 1916. Woodlands is the name of a house at the school.

Words
Some hymnals present different verses: often the second verse below is omitted, and the final verse in School Praise is different to the final verse in other hymnals.

In popular culture
The cold open of BBC television's Silent Witness episode Suffer the Children uses Far round the world with tune Woodlands, first sung solo by boy treble Billy (Jack Finerty), who is then joined by the catholic school choir which mixes to a young gospel choir to provide the only link between the two otherwise separate stories interwoven in this episode.

References

Far round the world
20th-century hymns